In mathematics, and in particular homotopy theory, a hypercovering (or hypercover) is a simplicial object that generalises the Čech nerve of a cover. For the étale topology and other sites, these conditions fail. Hypercoverings have a central role in étale homotopy and other areas where homotopy theory is applied to algebraic geometry, such as motivic homotopy theory.

Formal definition
The original definition given for étale cohomology by Jean-Louis Verdier in SGA4, Expose V, Sec. 7, Thm. 7.4.1, to compute sheaf cohomology in arbitrary Grothendieck topologies. For the étale site the definition is the following:

A hypercover is a semisimplicial object  of this category such that  is an étale cover and such that  is an étale cover for every .

The morphisms are given by the boundary maps of the semisimplicial object .

Properties
The Verdier hypercovering theorem states that the abelian sheaf cohomology of an étale sheaf can be computed as a colimit of the cochain cohomologies over all hypercovers.

For a locally Noetherian scheme , the category  of hypercoverings modulo simplicial homotopy is cofiltering, and thus gives a pro-object in the homotopy category of simplicial sets. The geometrical realisation of this is the Artin-Mazur homotopy type. A generalisation of E. Friedlander using bisimplicial hypercoverings of simplicial schemes is called the étale topological type.

References

 
  
 Lecture notes by G. Quick "Étale homotopy lecture 2."
 

Homotopy theory